Marcela Cuesta (born March 31, 1972) is a retired female butterfly and freestyle swimmer from Costa Rica, who won three medals (one silver and two bronze) with the women's relay team at the 1987 Pan American Games. She represented her native country at the 1988 Summer Olympics in Seoul, South Korea.

References
 sports-reference

1972 births
Living people
Female butterfly swimmers
Costa Rican female freestyle swimmers
Costa Rican female swimmers
Swimmers at the 1987 Pan American Games
Swimmers at the 1988 Summer Olympics
Olympic swimmers of Costa Rica
Pan American Games silver medalists for Costa Rica
Pan American Games bronze medalists for Costa Rica
Pan American Games medalists in swimming
Central American and Caribbean Games gold medalists for Costa Rica
Central American and Caribbean Games medalists in swimming
Competitors at the 1986 Central American and Caribbean Games
Medalists at the 1987 Pan American Games
20th-century Costa Rican women
21st-century Costa Rican women